Iddrisu Baba Mohamed (born 22 January 1996) is a Ghanaian professional footballer who plays as a midfielder for Spanish club RCD Mallorca and the Ghana national team.

Club career
Born in Accra, Baba moved to Spain at an early age and joined RCD Mallorca's youth setup in January 2014, from CD Leganés. He made his senior debut for the former's reserves on 29 August 2015, coming on as a second-half substitute in a 7–1 Tercera División home routing of Penya Ciutadella.

Baba scored his first senior goal on 8 May 2016, netting the opener in a 2–1 home win against CF Platges de Calvià. On 23 June, after achieving promotion, he was bought outright by the Bermellones.

On 25 August 2017, Baba was loaned to Barakaldo CF in Segunda División B, for one year. Upon returning, he was promoted to the main squad in Segunda División, and made his professional debut on 19 August 2018, replacing Carlos Castro in a 1–0 home win against CA Osasuna.

On 3 July 2019, after contributing with 28 matches (play-offs included) as his side achieved promotion to La Liga, Baba renewed his contract until 2022. He made his debut in the category on 17 August, starting in a 2–1 home win over SD Eibar.

International career
On 13 November 2019, Baba was called up for the Ghana national team to 2021 Africa Cup of Nations qualification matches against South Africa and São Tomé and Príncipe. He made his full international debut in the following day, starting in a 2–0 win over the former. He was part of the Ghanaian team in the 2021 African Cup of Nations and sustained an injury in the match against Gabon.

Career statistics

Club

International

References

External links
Profile at the RCD Mallorca website

1996 births
Living people
Footballers from Accra
Ghanaian footballers
Association football midfielders
Ghana international footballers
La Liga players
Segunda División players
Segunda División B players
Tercera División players
CD Leganés B players
RCD Mallorca B players
Barakaldo CF footballers
RCD Mallorca players
Ghanaian expatriate footballers
Ghanaian expatriate sportspeople in Spain
Expatriate footballers in Spain
2021 Africa Cup of Nations players